Martti Halme (born 5 April 1943) is a Finnish footballer. He played in 12 matches for the Finland national football team from 1964 to 1969.

References

1943 births
Living people
Finnish footballers
Finland international footballers
Place of birth missing (living people)
Association footballers not categorized by position